Aeropuerto T1-T2-T3 is a station on Line 8 of the Madrid Metro next to terminal T2 of Adolfo Suárez Madrid–Barajas Airport, in the Madrid district of the same name. It is located in fare Zone A.

The station opened to the public on 14 June 1999 under the name Aeropuerto. The line was opened by the King and Queen of Spain along with the chairman of the Community of Madrid. Construction of the expansion of line 8 were funded by the European Union Cohesion Fund.

On 3 May 2007 the station was renamed Aeropuerto T1, T2, T3, after the Terminal 4 extension opened.

References 

Airport railway stations in Spain
Line 8 (Madrid Metro) stations
Railway stations in Spain opened in 1999